Japoatã is a municipality located in the Brazilian state of Sergipe. Its population was 13,429 (2020) and its area is 420 km².

References

Municipalities in Sergipe